Cape São Roque (Port. Cabo de São Roque) or Cape of Saint Roch, is a cape in the northeastern tip of Brazil.

Cape São Roque  is located in the municipality of Maxaranguape, 51 km north of Natal, in the state of Rio Grande do Norte in Brazil. Cape São Roque is the "point" on the bend of the Brazilian mainland coast that is closest to the continent of Africa.

The cape was first officially visited by European navigators in 1501, in the 1501–1502 Portuguese mapping expedition led by André Gonçalves and Amerigo Vespucci, who named the spot after the saint of the day, St. Roch, whose feast day is August 16.

References 

Landforms of Rio Grande do Norte
Sao Roque